Brown County Airport  is a mile north of Georgetown, in Brown County, Ohio.

Many U.S. airports use the same three-letter location identifier for the FAA and IATA, but this airport is GEO to the FAA and has no IATA code. (IATA assigned GEO to
Cheddi Jagan International Airport in Timehri, Guyana).

Facilities
Its single runway, 18/36, is 3,530 by 65 feet (1,076 x 20 m) asphalt.

In the year ending May 22, 2009 the airport had 8,030 aircraft operations, average about 154 per week: 98% general aviation, 2% air taxi and <1% military. 19 aircraft were then based at this airport: 90% single-engine, 5% multi-engine, and 5% helicopter.

References

External links 
 

Airports in Ohio
Buildings and structures in Brown County, Ohio
Transportation in Brown County, Ohio